A Tiger in Winter is a 2017 South Korean comedy drama film written and directed by Lee Kwang-kuk and starring Lee Jin-wook and Go Hyun-jung. It made its world premiere in the Korean Cinema Today at the 22nd Busan International Film Festival in 2017.

Plot
Gyeong-yu (Lee Jin-wook) has nowhere to stay when his girlfriend asks him to vacate her apartment for a few days while her parents visit. While working as a substitute driver, he meets his ex-girlfriend Yoo-jung (Go Hyun-jung). Can they start over as they face challenges in their lives?

Cast
 Lee Jin-wook as Gyeong-yu
 Go Hyun-jung as Yoo-jung
 Seo Hyun-woo as corrupt
 Ryu Hyun-kyung as Hyeon-ji
 Kim Dae-gon as Fast-food restaurant manager	
 Kim Ye-eun as substitute guest
 Moon Chang-gil as middle-aged guest

References

External links
 
 
 

2017 films
South Korean comedy-drama films
2010s Korean-language films
Films directed by Lee Kwang-kuk
2010s South Korean films